Manuel de Jesus Lopes  (born August 19, 1982) is a Mozambican footballer.

Career
Career statistics

Last update: 27 June 2010

References

External links

Panthraxstats
NFT Profile

1982 births
Living people
Sportspeople from Maputo
Mozambican footballers
Mozambican expatriate footballers
Mozambique international footballers
Association football midfielders
PFC Beroe Stara Zagora players
Panetolikos F.C. players
Panthrakikos F.C. players
APOP Kinyras FC players
Expatriate footballers in Bulgaria
Expatriate footballers in Greece
Expatriate footballers in Cyprus
Expatriate footballers in Angola
Mozambican expatriate sportspeople in Bulgaria
Mozambican expatriate sportspeople in Greece
Mozambican expatriate sportspeople in Cyprus
Mozambican expatriate sportspeople in Angola
First Professional Football League (Bulgaria) players